A civil parish is a country subdivision, forming the lowest unit of local government in England. There are 218 civil parishes in the ceremonial county of Cornwall, which includes the Isles of Scilly. The county is effectively parished in its entirety; only the unpopulated Wolf Rock is unparished. At the 2001 census, there were 501,267 people living in the current parishes, accounting for the whole of the county's population. The final unparished areas of mainland Cornwall, around St Austell, were parished on 1 April 2009 to coincide with the structural changes to local government in England.

Population sizes within the county vary considerably, Falmouth is the most populous with a population of 26,767, recorded in 2011, and St Michael's Mount the least with 29 residents. The county is governed by two separate unitary authorities; Cornwall Council covers mainland Cornwall, while the Isles of Scilly are administered by their own unitary authority.

History
Parishes arose from Church of England divisions, and were originally purely ecclesiastical. Over time, they acquired civil administration powers.

The Highways Act 1555 made parishes responsible for the upkeep of roads. Every adult inhabitant of the parish was obliged to work four days a year on the roads, providing their own tools, carts and horses; the work was overseen by an unpaid local appointee, the Surveyor of Highways.

The poor were looked after by the monasteries, until their dissolution. In 1572, magistrates were given power to 'survey the poor' and impose taxes for their relief. This system was made more formal by the Poor Law Act 1601, which made parishes responsible for administering the Poor Law; overseers were appointed to charge a rate to support the poor of the parish. The 19th century saw an increase in the responsibility of parishes, although the Poor Law powers were transferred to Poor Law Unions. The Public Health Act 1872 grouped parishes into Rural Sanitary Districts, based on the Poor Law Unions; these subsequently formed the basis for rural districts.

Parishes were run by vestries, meeting annually to appoint officials, and were generally identical to ecclesiastical parishes, although some townships in large parishes administered the Poor Law themselves. Under the Divided Parishes and Poor Law Amendment Act 1882, all extra-parochial areas and townships that levied a separate rate became independent civil parishes.

Civil parishes in their modern sense date from the Local Government Act 1894, which abolished vestries; established elected parish councils in all rural parishes with more than 300 electors; grouped rural parishes into Rural Districts; and aligned parish boundaries with county and borough boundaries. Urban civil parishes continued to exist, and were generally coterminous with the urban district, municipal borough or county borough in which they were situated. Many large towns contained a number of parishes, and these were usually merged into one. Parish councils were not formed in urban areas, and the only function of the parish was to elect guardians to Poor Law Unions. With the abolition of the Poor Law system in 1930 the parishes had only a nominal existence.

The Local Government Act 1972 retained civil parishes in rural areas, and many former urban districts and municipal Boroughs that were being abolished, were replaced by new successor parishes. Urban areas that were considered too large to be single parishes became unparished areas.

Current position
Recent governments have encouraged the formation of town and parish councils in unparished areas. The Local Government and Rating Act 1997 gave local residents the right to demand the creation of a new civil parish.

A parish council can become a town council unilaterally, simply by resolution. A civil parish can also gain city status, but only if that is granted by the Crown. The chairman of a town or city council is called a mayor. The Local Government and Public Involvement in Health Act 2007 introduced alternative names: a parish council can now choose to be called a community; village; or neighbourhood council.

Within Cornwall, the 2007 Act lead to the abolition of the six district councils and Cornwall County Council, establishing in their place the single unitary authority, Cornwall Council. All civil parish councils became the responsibility of this authority. At the same time, four new civil parishes were created in the St Austell area, parishing the last remaining populated part of the county.

List of civil parishes and unparished area

See also

 List of civil parishes in England
 List of places in Cornwall

Notes
From 1974 to 2009, mainland Cornwall was divided into districts: Caradon, formed from Liskeard Municipal Borough, Liskeard Rural District, Looe Urban District, Saltash Municipal Borough, St Germans Rural District and Torpoint Urban District; Carrick, formed from Falmouth Municipal Borough, Penryn Municipal Borough, Truro Municipal Borough and Truro Rural District; Kerrier, formed from Camborne–Redruth Urban District, Helston Municipal Borough and Kerrier Rural District; North Cornwall, formed from Bodmin Municipal Borough, Bude–Stratton Urban District, Camelford Rural District, Launceston Municipal Borough, Launceston Rural District, Stratton Rural District and Wadebridge and Padstow Rural District; Penwith, formed from Penzance Municipal Borough, St Ives Municipal Borough, St Just Urban District and West Penwith Rural District; and Restormel, formed from Newquay Urban District, St Austell Rural District and St Austell with Fowey Municipal Borough

References

External links
 Office for National Statistics : Geographical Area Listings
 Cornwall Council: Names of Town and Parish Councils

 
Civil parishes
Cornwall
Civil parishes in Cornwall, List of